In ufology, Nordic alien is the name given to fictional humanoid extraterrestrials purported to come from the Pleiades who resemble Nordic-Scandinavians. Professed contactees describe them as being six to seven feet tall (about two meters) with long blonde hair, blue eyes, and fair skin. Debunked ufologist George Adamski is credited with being among the first to claim contact with Nordic aliens in the mid 1950s, and scholars note that the mythology of extraterrestrial visitation from beings with features described as "Aryan" often include claims of telepathy, benevolence, and physical beauty.

History
Cultural historian David J. Skal wrote that early stories of Nordic-type aliens may have been partially inspired by the 1951 film The Day the Earth Stood Still, in which an extraterrestrial arrives on Earth to warn humanity about the dangers of atomic weapons. Bates College professor Stephanie Kelley-Romano described alien abduction beliefs as "a living myth", and notes that, among believers, Nordic aliens "are often associated with spiritual growth and love and act as protectors for the experiencers."

In contactee and ufology literature, Nordic aliens are often described as benevolent or even "magical" beings who want to observe and communicate with humans and are concerned about the Earth's environment or prospects for world peace. Believers also ascribe telepathic powers to Nordic aliens, and describe them as "paternal, watchful, smiling, affectionate, and youthful."

During the 1950s, many contactees, especially those in Europe, claimed encounters with beings fitting this description. Such claims became relatively less common in subsequent decades, as the grey alien supplanted the Nordic in most alleged accounts of extraterrestrial encounters.

Publications by people claiming to have been contacted 
Books that claim there was personal contact with Nordic aliens include George Adamski's Flying Saucers Have Landed and Inside the Space Ships, Howard Menger's From Outer Space to You,; and  Travis Walton's The Walton Experience.

See also
 Truman Bethurum
 Elizabeth Klarer
 Space Brothers
 Billy Meier
 Linda Moulton Howe
 Star people (New Age)
 Arcturians (New Age)
 UFOs
 UFO religion

References

External links 
 

Alleged UFO-related entities
Nordicism
Taurus (constellation)